Warm Springs State Recreation Site was a state park in the U.S. state of Oregon, administered by the Oregon State Parks and Recreation Department.

See also
 List of Oregon state parks

References

Geography of Jefferson County, Oregon
Former state parks of the United States